Something to Remember Me By is a 2005 Spanish drama film directed by  which stars Emma Vilarasau, Fernando Fernán-Gómez, Marta Etura, and Roger Coma.

Plot 
The plot concerns about a family drama involving director Irene, her aging father Mateo and her son David, an architecture student who maintains a relation with cashier Clara. Upon the death of David in a car accident, Mateo begins to write his grandson's story.

Cast

Production 
The film was produced by Continental Producciones alongside Televisión de Galicia. It also had the participation of TVE and Canal+.

Release 
The film premiered at the 55th Berlin International Film Festival in February 2005, presented as a 'Special Screening' out of competition. Distributed by Alta Classics, it was theatrically released in Spain on 18 February 2005.

Reception 
Jonathan Holland of Variety deemed the "tightly buttoned, trigenerational family drama" to be "worthy but dull".

The review in El País observed that despite the film starting with "cheesy" trappings, the plot takes a "spectacular turn" by dealing a "brutal blow", eventually underpinning the film as "one of those movies that serve to learn more about life".

Accolades 

|-
| rowspan = "9" align = "center" | 2006 
| rowspan = "3" | 20th Goya Awards || Best Actress || Emma Vilarasau ||  || rowspan = "3" | 
|-
| Best Supporting Actress || Marta Etura || 
|-
| Best Art Direction || Federico G. Gambero, Félix Murcia || 
|-
| rowspan = "5" | 4th Mestre Mateo Awards || colspan = "2" | Best Film ||  || rowspan = "5" | 
|-
| Best Director || Patricia Ferreira || 
|-
| Best Actor || Fernando Fernán-Gómez || 
|-
| Best Supporting Actress || Marta Etura || 
|-
| Best Supporting Actor || Víctor Mosqueira || 
|-
| 15th Actors and Actresses Union Awards || Best Film Actress in a Secondary Role || Marta Etura ||  || 
|}

See also 
 List of Spanish films of 2005

References 

Films shot in Galicia (Spain)
Films shot in the Community of Madrid
2005 drama films
2000s Spanish films
2000s Spanish-language films